Irena Šinko (born 5 January 1964) is a Slovenian government official and lawyer. She serves as the minister of agriculture, forestry and food of the Republic of Slovenia since 2022.

Early life and career 
Šinko graduated with a degree in agricultural engineering from the University of Ljubljana and in law at the University of Maribor. She worked as a technologist in a feed factory in Lendava. From 1995, she headed the department of Agriculture and economy in the administrative unit of Murska Sobota. Between 2010–2018, she served as the director of the state fund for Agricultural and Forest land.

In June 2022, on the recommendation of the Freedom Movement, she took the position of the minister of agriculture, forestry and food in the government of Robert Golob.

References 

1964 births
Living people
21st-century Slovenian politicians
Agriculture ministers of Slovenia
Freedom Movement (Slovenia) politicians
Women government ministers of Slovenia